Henry Ford (born October 30, 1971 in Fort Worth, Texas) is a former American football defensive tackle in the National Football League. Ford played most of his career for the Houston Oilers / Tennessee Oilers / Tennessee Titans, and played one year for the New Orleans Saints. Ford was drafted in the 1st round of the 1994 NFL Draft by the Oilers out of the University of Arkansas. In 1999, the Titans made it to Super Bowl XXXIV in which Ford appeared as a substitute, however they lost to the Kurt Warner-led St. Louis Rams.

In high school, Henry Ford played football for Fort Worth (TX) Trimble Tech. Ford played college football on the University of Arkansas football team. 

Ford’s numbers at Arkansas were impressive. During a career that was split evenly between the SWC and SEC, he racked up 25 sacks and 43 tackles for loss, which rank second and third in UA history, respectively. His best season came in 1993 as a senior, when he set school records for sacks (14) and tackles for loss (23) and became the first Arkansas player to earn first-team All-SEC honors from the AP and coaches. Those marks have since been tied, but still rank first on the single-season lists.

During his 10-year NFL career, Ford started 76 of the 133 games in which he appeared and made 275 tackles, including 24 sacks. He also forced two fumbles and recovered six, including one he returned 30 yards for a touchdown.

References

https://arkansas.rivals.com/news/all-arkansas-nfl-draft-team-defense

External links
NFL.com player page

1971 births
Living people
Players of American football from Fort Worth, Texas
American football defensive tackles
American football defensive ends
Arkansas Razorbacks football players
Houston Oilers players
Tennessee Oilers players
Tennessee Titans players
New Orleans Saints players